The 1971 Harrow Council election took place on 13 May 1971 to elect members of Harrow London Borough Council in London, England. The whole council was up for election; no party gained overall control.

Background

Election result

Ward results

References

1971
1971 London Borough council elections